The Mnet Asian Music Award for Best OST (베스트 OST) is an award presented annually by CJ E&M Pictures (Mnet). It was first awarded at the 1st Mnet Asian Music Awards ceremony held in 2004; Jo Sungmo won the award for his song "By Your Side" in Lovers in Paris series, and it is given in honor for the performers with the best soundtrack contribution in a television series.

Winners and nominees

 Each year is linked to the article about the Mnet Asian Music Awards held that year.

Gallery of winners

Notes

References

External links
 Mnet Asian Music Awards official website

MAMA Awards
Film awards for Best Song